The 10th Moscow International Film Festival was held 7-21 July 1977. The Golden Prizes were awarded to the Hungarian film The Fifth Seal directed by Zoltán Fábri, the Spanish film El puente directed by Juan Antonio Bardem and the Soviet film Mimino directed by Georgiy Daneliya.

Jury
 Stanislav Rostotsky (USSR - President of the Jury)
 Salah Abu Seif (Egypt)
 Barbara Brylska (Poland)
 Souna Boubakar (Niger)
 Valerio Zurlini (Italy)
 Michael Kutza (USA)
 Toshiro Mifune (Japan)
 Vladimir Naumov (USSR)
 István Nemeskürty (Hungary)
 Yuri Ozerov (USSR)
 Ion Popescu-Gopo (Romania)
 Humberto Solás (Cuba)
 Rene Thevenet (France)
 Basu Chatterjee (India)
 Suimenkul Chokmorov (USSR)
 Milutin Colic (Yugoslavia)

Films in competition
The following films were selected for the main competition:

Awards
 Golden Prizes:
 The Fifth Seal by Zoltán Fábri
 El puente by Juan Antonio Bardem
 Mimino by Georgiy Daneliya
 Silver Prizes:
 Omar Gatlato by Merzak Allouache
 The Swimming Pool by Binka Zhelyazkova
 Shadow of the Castles by Daniel Duval
 Special Prizes:
 Night Over Chile by Sebastián Alarcón and Aleksandr Kosarev
 Río Negro by Manuel Pérez
 Prizes:
 Best Actor: Radko Polič for Idealist
 Best Actor: Amza Pellea for The Doom
 Best Actress: Mary Apick for Dead End
 Best Actress: Mercedes Carreras for Crazy Women
 Special Diploma: Young Actor: Lele Dorazio for Elvis! Elvis!
 Prix FIPRESCI: Kuntur Wachana by Federico García Hurtado

References

External links
Moscow International Film Festival: 1977 at Internet Movie Database

1977
1977 film festivals
1977 in the Soviet Union
1977 in Moscow